The Church of Our Lady of Sorrows, popularly known as Tierra Santa, is a Roman Catholic parish church in Montevideo, Uruguay.

The temple is dedicated to Our Lady of Sorrows. 

The parish was established on 30 October 1919. It is located in the barrio of Larrañaga, in an area which was part of La Blanqueada in the past. 

The Montevideo Philharmonic Orchestra holds concerts here during its seasons.

Same devotion
There are other churches in Uruguay dedicated to the Virgin of Sorrows:
 Church of Our Lady of Sorrows, also known as "Iglesia del Reducto", Montevideo
 Church of Our Lady of Sorrows in Pan de Azúcar
 Church of Our Lady of Sorrows in Dolores
 Parish Church of Our Lady of Sorrows and St. Isidore the Laborer in Libertad

References

External links
  

1919 establishments in Uruguay
Roman Catholic churches completed in 1919
Roman Catholic church buildings in Montevideo
Eclectic architecture
Larrañaga, Montevideo
20th-century Roman Catholic church buildings in Uruguay
Our Lady of Sorrows